Julia Randall Weertman (February 10, 1926 – July 31, 2018) was an American materials scientist who taught at Northwestern University as the Walter P. Murphy Professor of Materials Science and Engineering.

Education 
She was the first female student of the College of Science and Engineering at the Carnegie Institute of Technology, where she earned her baccalaureate and graduate degrees. 

Weertman met her husband Johannes at Carnegie, and both later joined the Northwestern University faculty.

Career
In 1986, Julia Weertman was awarded a Guggenheim Fellowship. She became the first woman in the United States to lead a materials science department when she was appointed chair of Northwestern's Department of Materials Science and Engineering the next year. Weertman was granted membership into the National Academy of Engineering in 1988, "for exceptional research on failure mechanisms in high-temperature alloys." In 1989, she became the first female member of the Board of Directors of The Minerals, Metals & Materials Society.

Fellowships
She was also a fellow of the American Academy of Arts and Sciences, ASM International, the American Physical Society, and the American Geophysical Union and the first female Fellow of The Minerals, Metals & Materials Society.

Death
Weertman died, aged 92, on July 31, 2018.

References

1926 births
2018 deaths
American materials scientists
Northwestern University faculty
Fellows of the American Academy of Arts and Sciences
Members of the United States National Academy of Engineering
Carnegie Mellon University alumni
Women materials scientists and engineers
American women engineers
20th-century American engineers
20th-century women engineers
Fellows of the Minerals, Metals & Materials Society